Windows Dev Kit 2023 (also known as Project Volterra) is an ARM-based compact desktop computer for software developers, developed by Microsoft. It was announced during the Build conference on May 24, 2022, and was released on October 24, 2022.

Windows Dev Kit 2023 came pre-loaded with Windows 11 Pro and features a Qualcomm Snapdragon 8cx Gen 3 system-on-a-chip (SoC), 32 GB LPDDR4X RAM, 512 GB NVMe SSD, Wi-Fi 6, Bluetooth 5.1, three USB-A, two USB-C, one Mini DisplayPort (with HBR2 support), and physical Ethernet ports. It can support up to three external monitors simultaneously. The device's shell design is "made with 20% recycled ocean plastic".

Windows Dev Kit 2023 contains a neural processing unit (NPU), enabling developers "to run hardware-accelerated AI tasks and machine learning workloads".

Supported languages
The device was released on October 24, 2022, in Australia, Canada, China, France, Germany, Japan, the United Kingdom, and the United States.

The device supports German, English, French, Japanese, and Chinese as available languages from the time the device is first turned on. Like other Windows devices, other language packs are available for download depending on the region.

The following table shows all languages that are compatible, including those for Windows Subsystem with Android.

References

Microsoft hardware
Computer-related introductions in 2022